Deir Mimas (also spelled Deirmimas, Deir Mamas, and Deir Mimmas)  (دير ميماس)  is a town 88 km south of Beirut in Lebanon. Named in honor of Saint Mamas, the town overlooks the Litani River and the medieval Beaufort Castle to the west and the snow-capped summits of Mount Hermon to the east. It has a population of around 4,600 people.

Etymology 
According to E. H. Palmer the name means: "the convent of Mimâs".

Deir is derivative from the Semitic, meaning house or convent.  Mimas refers to Saint Mamas, the third century shepherd who preached Christianity and had a lion as a protector.  Saint Mamas became martyr after his examination in the persecutions of Aurelian. In the Middle Ages, a convent was built in honor of Saint Mamas on top of a hill surrounded by olive groves.  A village grew around the convent, and it was eventually named in honor of the Convent of Saint Mamas.

History
In 1838, Eli Smith noted Deir Mimas's population as  Greek Orthodox and Catholic  Christians.

In 1852, Edward Robinson noted the village from Beaufort Castle.

In 1875 Victor Guérin  visited; the population ascribed to Deir Mimas by Guerin was 1,000. With the exception of twenty Protestants, he says, they were all "Schismatic Greeks".

In 1881, the PEF's Survey of Western Palestine (SWP)  described it as: "A village, built of stone, containing about 300 Christians, surrounded by large groves of olives, and gardens of figs, pomegranates, and vineyards, with arable land to the east. There is a modern church in the village, which is well supplied with water from springs."

The village was heavily damaged and 5 people where killed after the Galilee earthquake of 1837.

Modern era

Agriculture 
In addition to the cultivation of grapes, and figs,  Deir Mimas continues to be a major producer of olives and olive oil. It is home to around 130,000 - 150,000  olive trees some of which date back hundreds of years. Three olive oil press facilities are available providing their services to olive farmers from Deir Mimas and surrounding villages. Olive oil produced in Deir Mimas is known to be as one of the best in Lebanon. Olive Oil produced in Deirmimas under the name "Mariams Gold" ranked fourth among the products of more than 80 of the largest producing companies of the world in a contest organised by the German "Biofach 2012″ exhibition at Nuremberg , Germany.

Demography 

The inhabitants of Deir Mimas are Lebanese and followers of the Eastern Orthodox, Presbyterian and Greek Catholic churches. Latin Church followers exist in the village in addition to a Maronite minority.

One of the most known individuals from Deir Mimas is Dr. George Fawaz, a renowned former pharmacologist at the American University of Beirut.
One of the priests that served most of his entire life is buried at the back of the church in Mar Mama. His name was the servant of God Gerges Chammas. The location is behind the church to the east side.
He was a great servant and devoted his life to serve Christ and his followers.

Holidays 
In addition to Christmas and Easter, the town celebrates the feast of Saint Mamas on September 15.  Grand festivities are organized each year to honor the town's patron saint. Celebrations take place where masses are held at the "Deir" the Convent situated on a hill and facing the mountain and the litani river. Villagers meet, talk and gather over a nice array of food that many housewives have prepared.

Churches 
Deirmimas is considered as the closest Lebanese Christion village to the Holy land. It is 70 km far from Nazareth and 170 km far from Jerusalem. The village has seven different churches serving the population:
1. Saint Mamas Monastery for the Greek Orthodox 
2. Saint Michel Church for the Greek Orthodox 
3. Saint Mamas Church for the Melkite Catholics 
4. Santa Maria Monastery for the Latin Catholics 
5. Santa Maria Church for the Latin Catholics 
6. Protestant Church 
7. Deirmimas Baptist Church

Saint Mamas Monastery for the Greek Orthodox
 
The monastery of St. Mema from which Deirmimas takes its name was built around 1404 A.D. The original monastery was a simple medieval construction with 6 monks' cells, situated by a small church. The monastery fell into decay and was restored a number of times, most recently in 2004 before it was totally demolished during the 2006 Israeli war on Lebanon. The present plan for the reconstruction of the site, which has been financed by Qatar, began in 2008 and has replaced the old monastery with a much larger construction. The site has been inaugurated by the ruler of Qatar and the Lebanese authorities in 2010. Since, the Monastery is open daily to all devotees and visitors from 9:00am to 7:00pm.
 
Unlike the West, where Christmas ranks supreme, in the East it is Easter, centered on the cross and the resurrection of Christ. Another supreme festival of the year is the St. Mema's festival on 15 September. On that day people take part in divine liturgy, after which they gather around for outdoor feast where everyone joins in to eat, drink and enjoy themselves.
 
The monastery is placed under the aegis of Father Salim Assaad who was given the reins of a ruined monastery and turned it not only into a peaceful place of worship but into a small museum for iconography. The icons are the most sacred, the most transcendent art that exists for the Orthodox Christians. The Monastery of St. Mema decorated with much admired mosaics depicting the life of Christ has been made the house of many windows into the kingdom of God.

Municipality 
The municipality of Deir Mimas was founded in 1961 launching its activities with a team of two employees and six municipal council members elected along with the first Mayor Mr. Phillipe Awdeh.

During the Israeli occupation of South Lebanon, the municipality was care-taken by the Governor of Marjeyoun from 1969 until Israel's withdrawal from south Lebanon. Post-occupation election were held in 2001.

Many international and national organizations assisted the municipality, most notably UNIFIL, the Spanish Government, the Qatari Government and the Mines Advisory Group.

People from Deir Mimas
Souha Bechara – Left-wing activist
George Fawaz – Doctor and publisher
Tony Anka – Musician

References

Bibliography

External links
 Deir Mimas, Localiban  
Survey of Western Palestine, Map 2:   IAA, Wikimedia commons
http://www.deirmimas-lb.com/
https://web.archive.org/web/20070213125942/http://www.catholic-forum.com/saintS/saintm31.htm

Populated places in Marjeyoun District